NZMC may refer to:

Code for Mount Cook Aerodrome
New Zealand Motor Corporation
New Zealand Music Commission
Royal New Zealand Army Medical Corps